Tejaswini Lonari is an Indian film and television actress. She made her film debut with No Problem. She made her television debut with Chittod Ki Rani Padmini Ka Johur as Padmini. Currently, she has participated in Bigg Boss Marathi 4 as a contestant.

Filmography

Films

Television

Music video

References

External links
 

Living people
Year of birth missing (living people)
Bigg Boss Marathi contestants
Actresses in Marathi television
Actresses in Hindi television
Actresses in Marathi cinema